Werner Brandes (10 July 1889 in Braunschweig – 30 September 1968) was a German cinematographer. Brandes moved to Britain in the late 1920s to work on several prestige films for British International Pictures.

Selected filmography

 Der Hund von Baskerville (1914)
 The Guilt of Lavinia Morland (1920)
 The Legend of Holy Simplicity (1920)
 The Golden Bullet (1921)
 Sins of Yesterday (1922)
 The Green Manuela (1923)
 The Island of Tears (1923)
 A Woman, an Animal, a Diamond (1923)
 Man Against Man (1924)
 The Humble Man and the Chanteuse (1925)
 Flight Around the World (1925)
 A Waltz Dream (1925)
 The Man in the Fire  (1926)
 His Toughest Case (1926)
 The Woman in the Cupboard (1927)
 His Late Excellency (1927)
 Moulin Rouge (1928)
 Tesha (1928)
 Piccadilly (1929)
 The League of Three (1929)
 The Informer (1929)
 The W Plan (1930)
 Waltz of Love (1930)
 The Blonde Nightingale (1930)
 Love's Carnival (1930)
 La maison jaune de Rio (1931)
 The Little Escapade (1931)
 Express 13 (1931)
 When Love Sets the Fashion (1932)
 Spoiling the Game (1932)
 Frederica (1933)
 The Country Schoolmaster (1933)
 The Star of Valencia (1933)
 A Door Opens (1933)
 Tales from the Vienna Woods (1934)
 Just Once a Great Lady (1934)
 A Day Will Come (1934)
 Song of Farewell (1934)
 Farewell Waltz (1934)
 The World's in Love (1935)
 Stradivarius (1935)
 Stradivari (1935)
 Regine (1935)
 Winter Night's Dream (1935)
 The Emperor's Candlesticks (1936)
 The Castle in Flanders (1936)
 Where the Lark Sings (1936)
 Lumpaci the Vagabond (1936)
 The Irresistible Man (1937)
 The Ruler (1937)
 Mirror of Life (1938)
 Der singende Tor (1939)
 Dreams That Money Can Buy (1947)

References

Bibliography
 Bergfelder, Tim & Cargnelli, Christian. Destination London: German-speaking emigrés and British cinema, 1925–1950. Berghahn Books, 2008.

External links

1889 births
1968 deaths
German cinematographers
Mass media people from Braunschweig
Film people from Lower Saxony